Martin Parmer (born Martin Palmer June 4, 1778 – March 2, 1850) was an eccentric 19th-century American frontiersman, statesman, politician and soldier. On March 2, 1836, Martin Parmer seconded Sam Houston's motion to adopt the Texas Declaration of Independence from Mexico. Parmer signed the Texas Declaration of Independence and was Chairman of the Committee that drafted the Constitution of the Republic of Texas.

Early years

The Virginia-born Parmer, (who would later change the spelling of his surname to Parmer) made a name for himself as an Indian fighter in the Missouri Territory prior to Missouri's admission as a State in the Union. During this time he acquired his sobriquet, "The Ringtailed Panther," by which he would be known throughout Missouri and later Texas. When Missouri became a state, Parmer was elected a State Representative to the First Missouri General Assembly. Later Parmer was elected a State Senator to the Third Missouri General Assembly. While serving as a State Senator, William Clark (explorer) appointed Martin Parmer as an Indian sub-agent to the Iowa Indians.

Moving to Texas

Martin Parmer first came to Texas in the 1825 as part of Haden Edwards's colony.  Conditions between the settlers Edwards had relocated in Texas and older settlers in the area steadily deteriorated. On October 15, 1826, Otto Askins swore out an affidavit stating that Parmer had murdered his brother Moton Askins:

Samuel Norris, the Alcalde of Nacogdoches, issued a warrant for Parmer's arrest:

With the issuance of the arrest warrant for murder, Parmer would normally have had two options, 1) He could flee back into the United States, or 2) He could allow himself to be arrested and stand trial for murder.  Neither of these options appealed to Parmer, so six weeks later, on November 23, 1826, Martin Parmer rode into Nacogdoches at the head of a force of men from the Ayish Bayou District and arrested all the government officials including Samuel Norris and Hayden Edwards and assumed control of the local government. One of Parmer's first actions was to order that all Americans in Nacogdoches be compelled to bear arms.

Parmer conducted a "Courts Martial" of the local government officials for which he sat as the Judge. With the exception of Hayden Edwards, Martin Parmer found all the government officials guilty and sentenced them to death.  He commuted their sentences on the promise of each that they would leave Texas and never return. Following the trial, Parmer left Joseph Durst in charge as the Alcalde in Nacogdoches and returned to Ayish Bayou.

In December 1826, Parmer led the Fredonian Rebellion, declaring the area around Nacogdoches the independent Republic of Fredonia. The preamble of the Fredonian Declaration of Independence set out the grievances of the parties:

The Fredonian Declaration of Independence was signed as follows:

Empresario Stephen F. Austin strongly opposed the Fredonian rebels and encouraged the settlers in his colony to fight on behalf of Mexico in the conflict. In a letter to his colonists dated January 1, 1827, Stephen F. Austin mentioned Martin Parmer's role as leader of the rebellion:

The Fredonian Republic stood for just over a month; Parmer fled to Louisiana when the Mexican army arrived in Nacogdoches at the end of January 1827.

Texas Revolution

Parmer returned to Texas in 1831 and was an early figure in the history of the Republic of Texas. Frank W. Johnson, a leader in the Texas Revolution, provided the following account of Parmer's return to Texas in 1831 in the company of James Bowie:

During the Texas Revolution, Parmer served as a delegate from the District of Teneha to the Consultation of 1835 at San Felipe. While serving as a delegate to the Consultation (Texas), Parmer placed Henry Smith's name into nomination for Governor of Texas. Henry Smith (Texas Governor) was elected Governor of Texas by the Consultation becoming the first American-born Governor of the Mexican territory of Texas. Later, at the Consultation, Parmer was elected a member of the General Council of Texas.

Shortly thereafter, Parmer was elected a delegate from the Municipality of San Augustine to the Convention at Washington-on-the-Brazos which began on March 1, 1836. On March 2, 1836, delegate Sam Houston moved for the adoption of the Texas Declaration of Independence and Martin Parmer seconded the motion.

The Declaration of Independence was unanimously approved by the Convention and Parmer signed the Texas Declaration of Independence from Mexico. Parmer was chairman of the committee that drafted the Constitution of the Republic of Texas. On March 6, 1836, the day the Alamo fell, Martin Parmer penned a letter to his wife from the Convention at Washington:

Charles B. Stewart, a delegate from the Municipality of Austin to the Convention at Washington-on-the-Brazos, was attributed the following quote regarding Martin Parmer:

Stephen W. Blount, another delegate to the Convention from the Municipality of San Augustine, gave the following account of Martin Parmer:

Parmer's activities during the Texas Revolution did not end with his services at the Convention. On March 16, 1836, as the Convention neared its conclusion, delegate Thomas Jefferson Rusk, the newly appointed Secretary of War, wishing to alleviate the shortage of supplies within the Texas army, proposed the following resolution giving Martin Parmer some rather extraordinary powers:

Parmer issued scrip for all the property he received on behalf of the new Republic of Texas. He signed the scrip: Martin Parmer, Agent for Texas.

Republic of Texas

In 1839, Republic of Texas President Mirabeau B. Lamar appointed Martin Parmer Chief Justice of Jasper County, Texas. Parmer died in Jasper County, Texas on Texas Independence Day March 2, 1850. His body was re-interred in the Texas State Cemetery in 1936 at the time of the Texas Centennial. He was buried some thirty feet away from the grave of Stephen F. Austin who had so vigorously opposed Parmer's early attempt to declare Texas independent of Mexico during the Fredonian Rebellion.

In 1874, Tom Parmer published a biographical booklet about the adventures of his father, Martin Parmer, on the Missouri frontier titled Fifty-Five Years Ago in the Wilderness or The Old Ringtail Panther of Missouri. Martin Parmer appeared as a major character in Joseph Alexander Altsheler's Texan historical fiction series: The Texan Star, the story of a great fight for liberty (1912); The Texan Scouts, the story of the Alamo and Goliad (1913); and The Texan Triumph, a romance of the San Jacinto campaign (1913).  In 1966, Martin Parmer appeared as a character in Giles A. Lutz's book The Hardy Breed an historical fiction about the Fredonian Rebellion.

The Texas Legislature established Parmer County, Texas in 1876.  Parmer County is named in honor of Martin Parmer "an eccentric Texan of olden time, and one of the signers of the Declaration of Texas Independence." In January 1882, the Capitol Syndicate agreed to build the Texas State Capitol in return for 3,000,000 acres of land in West Texas. Parmer County lay entirely within the lands granted to the Chicago Syndicate for its huge XIT Ranch.

Footnotes

References

The Lives of Ellis P. Bean, Lay, Bennett, University of Texas Press.

 The Personal Correspondence of Sam Houston, Vol I; Roberts, Madge Thornall, University of North Texas Press: .

External links
Parmer Grave - Texas State Cemetery
Martin Parmer - Agent for Texas
Example of Martin Parmer Scrip
 
Texas Declaration of Independence
Washington-on-the-Brazos State Park - The Birthplace of Texas
 Star of the Republic Museum
 
 
 

1778 births
1850 deaths
Republic of Texas politicians
People of the Texas Revolution
Signers of the Texas Declaration of Independence